Maxine Blomquist is a former netball player from New Zealand who represented her country on 31 occasions between 1974 and 1982.

Family
Maxine Blomquist was born on 13 March 1956. Many in her family have played netball. Her sister, Annette Heffernan played for the New Zealand national netball team between 1985 and 1990. Until 2016 these were the only sisters to play for the national team. Blomquist's playing career with the national team also overlapped with that of her cousin, Shirley Langrope. She is an aunt of Kate Heffernan, a netball player who has also played cricket for New Zealand, and her twin sister, Georgia, who also plays both sports at a high level.

Netball career
Blomquist first played for the Silver Ferns, the New Zealand national netball team, in November 1974, against England, being the 60th player to be selected for the team. A versatile player, she could play in a variety of positions although she was mainly a defender who took advantage of her height. She was chosen for the New Zealand team for the 1975 World Netball Championships, which were held in Auckland, New Zealand. Captained by her cousin, the Silver Ferns were unable to use their home advantage and finished third. Blomquist was also in the team for the 1979 World Championships, when the Silver Ferns finished in a three-way tie for first place with Australia and the hosts, Trinidad and Tobago.

References

1956 births
Living people
New Zealand international netball players
1975 World Netball Championships players 
1979 World Netball Championships players